Biscay is one of the three constituencies represented in the Basque Parliament, the regional legislature of the Basque Autonomous Community. The constituency currently elects 25 deputies. Its boundaries correspond to those of the Spanish province of Biscay. The electoral system uses the D'Hondt method and a closed-list proportional representation, with a minimum threshold of three percent.

Electoral system
The constituency was created as per the Statute of Autonomy for the Basque Country of 1979 and was first contested in the 1980 regional election. The Statute provided for the three provinces in the Basque Country—Álava, Biscay and Gipuzkoa—to be established as multi-member districts in the Basque Parliament, with this regulation being maintained under the 1983 and 1990 regional electoral laws. Each constituency is allocated a fixed number of 25 seats each, to provide for an equal representation of the three provinces in Parliament as required under the regional Statute. The exception was the 1980 election, when this number was 60.

Voting is on the basis of universal suffrage, which comprises all nationals over eighteen, registered in the Basque Country and in full enjoyment of their political rights. Amendments to the electoral law in 2011 required for Basques abroad to apply for voting before being permitted to vote, a system known as "begged" or expat vote. Seats are elected using the D'Hondt method and a closed list proportional representation, with an electoral threshold of three percent of valid votes—which, until 1983 and from 1990 includes blank ballots; also and until a 2000 reform, the threshold was set at five percent—being applied in each constituency. The use of the D'Hondt method may result in a higher effective threshold, depending on the district magnitude.

The electoral law allows for parties and federations registered in the interior ministry, coalitions and groupings of electors to present lists of candidates. Parties and federations intending to form a coalition ahead of an election are required to inform the relevant Electoral Commission within ten days of the election call—fifteen before 1985—whereas groupings of electors need to secure the signature of at least one percent of the electorate in the constituencies for which they seek election—one-thousandth of the electorate, with a compulsory minimum of 500 signatures, until 1983; and only the signature of 500 electors from 1983 to 1990—disallowing electors from signing for more than one list of candidates.

Deputies

Elections

2020 regional election

2016 regional election

2012 regional election

2009 regional election

2005 regional election

2001 regional election

1998 regional election

1994 regional election

1990 regional election

1986 regional election

1984 regional election

1980 regional election

See also
Biscay (Congress of Deputies constituency)
Biscay (Senate constituency)

References

Basque Parliament constituencies
Biscay
Constituencies established in 1980
1980 establishments in Spain